KIIZ-FM (92.3 MHz or Z-92.3) is a commercial urban contemporary radio station in Killeen, Texas. The station is owned and operated by iHeartMedia, Inc.  The station's studios are located in nearby Harker Heights, and its transmitter is located in Killeen.

History
KIIZ started in 1979 on 1050 AM. On February 15, 1991, KIIZ moved the station from the AM dial to the FM dial on to 92.3 FM.

External links
Z-92.3 official website

Urban contemporary radio stations in the United States
IIZ-FM
Radio stations established in 1979
1979 establishments in Texas
IHeartMedia radio stations